Cyperus prolifer is a species of sedge that is native to eastern parts of Africa. It is introduced and considered invasive in Florida.

See also 
 List of Cyperus species

References 

prolifer
Plants described in 1791
Flora of South Africa
Flora of Kenya
Flora of Madagascar
Flora of Mauritius
Flora of Mozambique
Flora of Somalia
Flora of Tanzania
Flora of Zimbabwe
Taxa named by Jean-Baptiste Lamarck